Baw Kyaw  (1370–1402) was a Hanthawaddy royal and governor of Dala–Twante from 1388/89 to 1402.

Kyaw was appointed governor of Dala in 1388/89 by his half-uncle King Razadarit, who had ordered Kyaw's father Nyi Kan-Kaung executed for suspicion of rebellion. Despite this, Kyaw was a loyal vassal to his uncle. He became a commander in the army, and fought in the war against the northern Ava Kingdom. He died in action outside Prome (Pyay) on 26 December 1402.

Notes

References

Bibliography
 
 

Hanthawaddy dynasty
1370s births
1402 deaths